Up – Up and Away is the debut album by American pop group the 5th Dimension, released in 1967 (see 1967 in music).  The title track was released as a single and became a major pop hit.

The group's first single release on Soul City Records, "Train Keep On Moving/I'll Be Loving You Forever" was not a success, and is not included in the album.  Both songs appear as bonus tracks on a later CD reissue of the album.

The first single released from this album, "Go Where You Wanna Go", was initially recorded by the Mamas & the Papas and appears on their first album. The 5th Dimension's version became a Top 20 hit in the US, reaching the #16 position.  The group's second release, "Another Day, Another Heartache", also charted, peaking at #45.

It was their third release, the ubiquitous "Up – Up and Away", that launched both the group and the song's writer, Jimmy Webb, into super-stardom.  The group and the song amassed a total of five different Grammy Awards between them in 1967.  Many different artists have since recorded versions of the song (see the entry concerning "Up, Up and Away" for further details).

The group appeared on many television shows of the day, including The Hollywood Palace, Shebang, and particularly The Ed Sullivan Show, where they became a favourite of the host. Performances exist of several of the album's songs from these myriad shows, including "Go Where You Wanna Go", "Another Day, Another Heartache", "Pattern People", "California My Way", and the title track of the album.

Track listing

Side One
"Up – Up and Away" (Jimmy Webb) – 2:45
"Another Day, Another Heartache" (Steve Barri, P.F. Sloan) – 2:37
"Which Way to Nowhere" (Webb) – 3:08
"California My Way" (Willie Hutch) – 2:56
"Misty Roses" (Tim Hardin) – 2:46

Side Two
"Go Where You Wanna Go" (John Phillips) – 2:22
"Never Gonna Be the Same" (Webb) – 2:26
"Pattern People" (Webb) – 3:02
"Rosecrans Blvd." (Webb) – 2:54
"Learn How to Fly" (Hutch) – 3:01
"Poor Side of Town" (Lou Adler, Johnny Rivers) – 3:21

CD Reissue Bonus Tracks
"I'll Be Loving You Forever" (Hutch) – 3:11
"Train Keep on Movin'" (Hutch) – 2:47
"Too Poor to Die" (Marc Gordon, Hutch) – 2:46

Personnel
The 5th Dimension
Billy Davis Jr. - lead vocals (track 12), background vocals
Florence LaRue - background vocals
Marilyn McCoo - lead vocals (track 10), background vocals
Lamonte McLemore - background vocals
Ron Townson - background vocals
Additional personnel
Al Casey - guitar, "eastern sounds" performed by 
Johnny Rivers - guitar
P. F. Sloan - guitar
Tommy Tedesco - guitar
Joe Osborn - bass, guitar 
Hal Blaine - drums, percussion
Larry Knechtel - piano, keyboards
Jimmy Webb - musical conductor, keyboards

Production
Producers: Johnny Rivers, Marc Gordon
Mastering: Elliot Federman
Project coordination: Arlessa Barnes, Glenn Delgado, Christina DeSimone, Robin Diamond, Mandana Eidgah, Karyn Friedland, Felicia Gearhart, Laura Gregory, Jeremy Holiday, Robin Manning, Brooke Nochomson, Ed Osborne, Larry Parra, Dana Renert, Bill Stafford, Steve Strauss
Production assistants: Bones Howe, Tom Tierney, Russ Wapensky
Archivist: Joanna Feltman
Transfers: Mike Hartry
Music arranged by: Jimmy Webb
Horns & Strings arranged by: Marty Paich
Art direction: Mathieu Bitton, Wardy Woodward
Design: Mathieu Bitton, Wayne Kimbell
Cover photo: Bernard Yeszin
Photography: Rob Santers
Liner notes: Mike Ragehoa

Charts and awards

Album
Billboard (North America)

Singles
Billboard (North America)

10th Annual Grammy Awards

|-
| rowspan="9" | 1968 || rowspan="6" | "Up – Up and Away" || Record of the Year || 
|-
| Song of the Year || 
|-
| Best Pop Performance by a Duo or Group with Vocals || 
|-
| Best Performance by a Vocal Group || 
|-
| Best Performance by a Chrous || 
|-
| Best Contemporary Song || 
|-
| rowspan="2" | Up – Up and Away || Best Pop Vocal Album || 
|-
| Best Recording Package || 
|-
| The 5th Dimension || Best Best New Artist ||

References

1967 debut albums
The 5th Dimension albums
Albums arranged by Marty Paich
Albums arranged by Jimmy Webb
Soul City Records (American label) albums
Albums recorded at United Western Recorders